Dale Risinger is an American civil engineer and Republican politician from Illinois. He was a member of the Illinois State Senate from 2003 to 2011.

Early life, education and business career
He was born January 10, 1944, in Odin, Illinois. He received a  B.S. in Civil Engineering from the University of Illinois. He worked as an engineer for the Illinois Department of Transportation, and later as Vice President of Business Development for Clark Engineers, Inc.

Illinois Senate
Risinger defeated Paul Mangieri, the State's Attorney for Knox County. He was re-elected in 2006, and in 2010. He served as Senate Republican Caucus Chairman in 2008.

During his service in the Illinois Senate, he served on the following Committees:

 Committees on Environment and Energy, (minority spokesperson)
 Appropriations II
 Financial Institutions
 Local Government
 Transportation
 Legislative Audit Commission
 Legislative Research Unit

Risinger resigned from the Illinois Senate on February 28, 2011. Darin LaHood was appointed by the Legislative Committee of the Republican Party of  the 37th Legislative District to the vacancy and sworn into office on March 1, 2011.

Personal life
He and his wife, Joyce, have three adult children and six grandchildren.

He serves as a member of the Executive Board for the International Construction Innovations Conference; Chairman of the National Traffic and Transportation Conference; member of the Board of the Industry Institute; member of the Executive Board of the Center for Emerging Technologies in Infrastructure; member and past chairman of advisory board for Bradley University College of Engineering and Technology; and a member of the Easter Seals Board, University of Illinois Alumni Association, Illinois Society of Professional Engineers, Illinois Association of Highway Engineers, National Society of Professional Engineers, Illinois Public Works Association, Rotary International, and a Christmas in April volunteer. He is a former Boy Scouts of America leader and school board member.

References

External links
Illinois General Assembly - Senator Dale Risinger (R) 37th District official IL Senate website
 

Republican Party Illinois state senators
Living people
1944 births
21st-century American politicians